The Bagirmi languages comprise half a dozen languages spoken in southern Chad. They are members of the Central Sudanic language family.

The most populous Bagirmi language is Naba, spoken by the Bilala, Kuka, and Medogo, who together number a quarter million. The languages are:
Barma (Bagirmi proper), Naba, Kenga, Fer, Beraku, Disa

Ethnologue lists a couple more (Jaya, Morom) between Kenga and Naba, and Gula (Sara Gula) further south, next to Sar.

Footnotes

References
Roger Blench

Bongo–Bagirmi languages
Languages of Chad